Michael Wood is an American cryptographer who designed the REDOC encryption system. He is also the author of The Jesus Secret and other books.

References

American cryptographers
Living people
Year of birth missing (living people)

4. Also later published website, 'Golden Rule Bible' see https://web.archive.org/web/20190513194715/http://www.goldenrulebible.com/introduction.html, also at the Wayback Machine. Both cited websites have been taken down, the Golden Rule Bible website first. The reasons for this are unknown.